The Forest Academy (formerly Hainault Forest High School) is a coeducational secondary school situated near to Hainault Forest Country Park in Hainault, London, England. The school is an academy sponsored by Beacon Multi Academy Trust. The Forest Academy is an Ofsted 'Good' school. It was inspected by Ofsted in January 2023, and was praised for -	
- “Pupils feel safe and are happy.”

-	“Staff have a positive working relationship with pupils, which reflects the school’s culture of respect."
 
-	“Pupils are polite and considerate of others.”

-	“Pupils learn in a calm environment and their attendance is high. Pupils behave well in lessons and around the school.”

-	“Leaders have designed an ambitious and well-ordered curriculum for all pupils… Teachers have strong subject knowledge and are specialists in their subjects.”

-	“Leaders and governors have high expectations for all pupils, including pupils with special educational needs and/or disabilities (SEND).”

 

Forest Academy has a co-located 6th form with the Outstanding Beal High School, where students enrolled at Beal 6th Form study courses at either The Forest Academy or Beal High School. Courses offered at The Forest Academy campus 6th form include a 3-year pathway, including GCSEs English and Maths and level 2 courses, A-levels and Level 3 vocational qualifications.

Notable former pupils
 Jimmy Greaves, international footballer who attended the school, and regularly returned to visit. 
https://en.wikipedia.org/wiki/Jimmy_Greaves
 Mz Bratt - Cleopatra Humphrey, electro/grime singer
 Justin Hoyte, footballer
 Bob Crow, trade union leader

References

External links
 The Forest Academy official website

Secondary schools in the London Borough of Redbridge
Academies in the London Borough of Redbridge